Spring Hollow Reservoir is a ,  side-stream reservoir in Roanoke County, Virginia with the largest roller-compacted concrete dam east of the Mississippi  Having commenced operation in 1996, it is now the main source of water for residents of Roanoke County.

History and Operations
Before the reservoir's construction, an ad hoc set of wells and water purchases served Roanoke County.  In 1986, county officials, anticipating increased water needs, sought and received voter approval for the Spring Hollow Reservoir.

Water is pumped from the nearby Roanoke River to the reservoir.

References

External links
 Flickr image of reservoir and dam

Protected areas of Roanoke County, Virginia
Reservoirs in Virginia
Bodies of water of Roanoke County, Virginia